Dikmetaş can refer to:

 Dikmetaş, Bayburt
 Dikmetaş, Demirözü
 Dikmetaş, Pazaryolu